Taşkale is a belde (town) in Karaman Province, Turkey.

Geography 
The older town is made of series of caves which are used presently as cereal silos. The population is 851. The modern quarter of the town is in the plains just to the north of the older quarter.

History and people 
The town was used by early Christians who used the caves as effective shelter against the Roman authorities. The Mamazan Monastery just at the west of the town is also a cave monastery. After Christianity was legalized, the town probably lost its importance. But in the 13th century the town regained its importance as a hideaway. During Mongol expansion, a Turkmen tribe named Kızıl from the valley of along Atrek River (modern Turkmenistan) migrated to Taşkale.
According to an unverified claim, the paternal side of Atatürk (founder of modern Turkey) was also a member of the Kızıl tribe.

Economy 
The main economic activity is the production of hand-made rugs. There are over 200 handlooms and the rugs produced in Taşkale are known as Kızıllar rugs (or sometimes ).

Future 

According to the Sustainable development report prepared by the Ministry of Environment and Forestry, the projected population of Taşkale in 2025 is 6000. The present master plan of the town is found to be insufficient for the future expansion. A renewed plan including tourism and marble mining facilities is proposed.

References 

Karaman Province
Karaman Central District